The Columns may refer to:

The Columns (Columbia, Missouri), a contributing structure on the National Register of Historic Places and symbol of the University of Missouri
The Columns (Tallahassee, Florida), listed on the National Register of Historic Places in Leon County, Florida
The Columns (Murfreesboro, North Carolina), listed on the National Register of Historic Places in Hertford County, North Carolina
Engineers' Club Building, once known as "The Columns", listed on the National Register of Historic Places in New York County, New York

See also
The Column, a 1968 Romanian historical film